Brickellia lanata  is a Mexican species of flowering plants in the family Asteraceae. It is native to western Mexico from Sinaloa south to Colima, and as far east as Zacatecas.

References

lanata
Flora of Mexico
Plants described in 1838